The Rural Municipality of Grayson No. 184 is a rural municipality (RM) in the Canadian province of Saskatchewan within Census Division No. 5 and  Division No. 1.

History 
The RM of Grayson No. 184 incorporated as a rural municipality on January 1, 1913.

Geography

Communities and localities 
The following urban municipalities are surrounded by the RM.
Dubuc
Killaly

The following unincorporated communities are within the RM.

Organized hamlets
Exner's Twin Bays
Greenspot
Moose Bay
Sunset Beach

Demographics 

Government 
The RM of Grayson No. 184 is governed by an elected municipal council and an appointed administrator that meets on the second Wednesday of every month. The reeve of the RM is Harvey Mucha while its administrator is Sarah Dietrich. The RM's office is located in Grayson.

References 

G

Division No. 5, Saskatchewan